Township 5 is a township in Rooks County, Kansas, United States.

History
Rooks County was established with four townships: Bow Creek, Lowell, Paradise and Stockton. That number increased to seven by 1878 and twenty three in 1925. The twenty three townships were in place until 1971 when the number was reduced to the current twelve townships.

Township 5 was formed from Rooks County townships Alcona, Bow Creek and Sugar Loaf in 1971 pursuant to Kansas Statute 80-1110. 80-1110 allowed for the disorganization of townships and assigning those territories to contiguous townships.

Bow Creek flows through Township 5, then on to Kirwin Reservoir in Phillips County.

Alcona Township
Alcona Township was established in 1879 from part of Stockton Township.

Bow Creek Township
Bow Creek was one of the original four Rooks County civil townships along with Lowell, Paradise and Stockton. The original Bow Creek Township was 6 miles north-to-south (1 survey township). The east border was with Lowell Township, 9 miles (1-1/2 survey townships) from the Osborne County line. The west border was the Graham County line making Bow Creek 21 miles (3-1/2 survey townships) wide. Farmington, Sugar Loaf and the west half of Lanark townships were originally part of Bow Creek Township.

Bow Creek Township was named for Bow Creek that flowed through the township.

Sugar Loaf Township
Sugar Loaf Township was established in 1880 from part of Bow Creek Township. The township was named for a unique rounded mound of flint rock that was once used as a lookout by Native Americans.

References

Townships in Rooks County, Kansas
Townships in Kansas